Dolomena is a genus of sea snails, marine gastropod mollusks in the family Strombidae, the true conchs.

The name of the genus Dolomena was originally introduced by Iredale in 1931, but he did not provide a description. Therefore he was not accepted as the author of this genus (Art. 13.1 of the ICZN Code)

Species
Species within the genus Dolomena include:
Dolomena abbotti Dekkers & Liverani, 2011
 † Dolomena bruneiensis Harzhauser, Raven & Landau, 2018 
Dolomena columba (Lamarck, 1822)
Dolomena dilatata (Swainson, 1821)
Dolomena hickeyi (Willan, 2000)
Dolomena labiosa (Wood, 1828)
Dolomena minima (Linnaeus, 1771)
Dolomena plicata (Röding, 1798)
Dolomena pulchella (Reeve, 1851)
Dolomena swainsoni (Reeve, 1851)
Dolomena variabilis (Swainson, 1820)
Dolomena wienekei Wiersma & D. Monsecour, 2012
Species brought into synonymy
 Dolomena septima (Duclos, 1844): synonym of Margistrombus septimus (Duclos, 1844)
Dolomena sibbaldi (Sowerby II, 1842): synonym of Dolomena plicata sibbaldii (G. B. Sowerby II, 1842)

References

 Liverani V. (2014) The superfamily Stromboidea. Addenda and corrigenda. In: G.T. Poppe, K. Groh & C. Renker (eds), A conchological iconography. pp. 1-54, pls 131-164. Harxheim: Conchbooks. 

Strombidae